Yezoites is an extinct genus of ammonites placed in the family Scaphitidae.  The genus is known lived during the Upper Cretaceous and was first described in 1910.  The genus contains five species, Y. bladenensis, Y. orbignyi, Y. planus, Y. puerculus, and Y. subevolutus.
              
Yezoites was first discovered in the Upper Cretaceous Yezo Group, Hokkaido, Japan  and has since been identified in Antarctica, Denmark, France, Madagascar, and the United States.  The shell has wide spaced ribbing.

References

Ammonitida genera
Scaphitidae
Cretaceous animals of Africa
Coniacian genus first appearances
Santonian genus extinctions